Apocalypse: World War I (in French: Apocalypse, la Première Guerre mondiale) is a TV series made up of 5 French documentaries created by Isabelle Clarke and Daniel Costelle, and narrated by Mathieu Kassovitz. Originally broadcast in 2014, it chronologically traces the history of World War I, from its origins to the end of the war. It gathers known or unpublished period documents and recounts the great events of the war, from restored and colorized archive images. It is part of the Apocalypse series, produced by CC&C and ECPAD.

It was originally broadcast on Belgian Une (RTBF) from March 2, 2014 to March 16, 2014, on France 2 from March 18, 2014 to April 1, 2014, and in Canada on TV5 Québec Canada in May 2014.

Episodes

See also
 Apocalypse: The Second World War
 Apocalypse: Hitler
 Apocalypse: Stalin
 Apocalypse: Verdun
 Apocalypse: Never-Ending War 1918-1926
 Apocalypse: the Cold War

References

External links
 Official website (in French)
 Information in IMDb
 Information in Filmaffinity
 Information in TV5 Québec Canada (in French)

French documentary television series
2014 French television series debuts
2014 French television series endings
Documentary television series about World War I